Monroe Hall is an unincorporated community in Westmoreland County, Virginia, United States. The site of James Monroe's birthplace is located in the community, and is marked with an obelisk, a historical marker, and a bronze plaque.

References

External links

Unincorporated communities in Westmoreland County, Virginia
James Monroe